Kersbrook Cross is a hamlet in the parish of Linkinhorne (where the population for the 2011 census was included.) in Cornwall, England. It is on the B3257 road from Plusha to Callington.

References

Hamlets in Cornwall